Blake Lloyd is an electrical engineer with Iris Power Engineering in Mississauga, Ontario. Lloyd was named a Fellow of the Institute of Electrical and Electronics Engineers (IEEE) in 2016 for his contributions to the development of non-intrusive diagnostics for electrical motors and generators.

References 

Fellow Members of the IEEE
Living people
Canadian engineers
Year of birth missing (living people)
Place of birth missing (living people)